Pterolophia minutior is a species of beetle in the family Cerambycidae. It was described by Stephan von Breuning in 1973.

References

minutior
Beetles described in 1973